Urocitellus is a genus of ground squirrels. They were previously believed to belong to the much larger genus Spermophilus, but DNA sequencing of the cytochrome b gene showed that this group was paraphyletic to the prairie dogs and marmots, and could therefore no longer be retained as a single genus. As a result, Urocitellus is now considered as a genus in its own right.

All but two species are native to the northern and western parts of North America, from California and Minnesota through the north-western United States and western Canada; the Arctic ground squirrel inhabits Arctic terrain on both sides of the Bering Strait, while the long-tailed ground squirrel is exclusively found in Asia. The name of the genus is said to be derived from the Latin uro, meaning "tail" and citellus for "ground squirrel". The proper word for "tail" in classical Latin is cauda. Oura (οὐρά) is the ancient Greek word for "tail".

Species
Thirteen species are currently identified:

Genus Urocitellus
 Uinta ground squirrel, Urocitellus armatus
 Belding's ground squirrel, Urocitellus beldingi
 Northern Idaho ground squirrel, Urocitellus brunneus
 Merriam's ground squirrel, Urocitellus canus
 Columbian ground squirrel, Urocitellus columbianus
 Wyoming ground squirrel, Urocitellus elegans
 Southern Idaho ground squirrel, Urocitellus endemicus
 Piute ground squirrel, Urocitellus mollis
 Arctic ground squirrel, Urocitellus parryii
 Richardson's ground squirrel, Urocitellus richardsonii
 Townsend's ground squirrel, Urocitellus townsendii
 Long-tailed ground squirrel, Urocitellus undulatus
 Washington ground squirrel, Urocitellus washingtoni

References

 
Rodent genera